The House of Bocignolo or Bučinić was a Ragusan noble family.

History 
It hailed from Chlieuno (Livno), a town in Hum. In the 15th century they were one of the eleven smallest Ragusan houses. It was mentioned as living in the city of Ragusa (Dubrovnik) in 1588. In 1535 a member was at Vienna in the service of Ferdinand Habsburg, the future emperor.

Prominent members 
Marini de Bocignolo (1319–63).
Gervasio de Bocignolo ( 1313).
Marino de Bocignolo ( 1380).
Маrinus de Buzignolo ( 1395).
Michael de Buzignolo ( 1455), rector.
Micho de Marinus Bocinolo ( 1414–66), politician.
Marinus de Micho de Marinus Bocinolo ( 1477–90), politician.
Michael Bucignoli ( 1524).
Michael and Paulus Bucignoli ( 1537).
Giovanni Bucignoli ( 1547).
Marco Buzignolo ( 1590), ambassador at Constantinople.
Marinus Petri de Bucignolo
Marinus Martoli de Bucignolo
Marinus Martcholi de Bucignoli.
Hierolamo di Marin di Bucignolo
Damianus Geruasii de Bocignolo
Damianus de Bozignolo

Annotations

References

Sources

Ragusan noble families